Colostethus panamansis, also known as the Panama rocket frog  or (ambiguously) common rocket frog, is a species of poison dart frog. It is found in northwestern Colombia and Panama. It is one of the best studied poison dart frogs; however, until 2004 Colostethus panamansis was considered a synonym of Colostethus inguinalis, and consequently the older literature uses that name.

Distribution and habitat

Colostethus panamansis is found in several parts of Panama and in Parque Nacional Natural Los Katios in Colombia. It is found living near streams in forested lowland and hilly country, usually at elevations below .

Biology
Adult males measure  in snout–vent length and adult females .

The female lays her eggs in clutches among leaf litter. When they hatch, she carries them around on her back for up to nine days when she immerses herself in a fast flowing stream and they become detached and continue their development in the water.

Research
The pathogenic fungus Batrachochytrium dendrobatidis causes the emerging infectious disease chytridiomycosis which is the cause of the decline in many species of tropical amphibian. Colostethus panamansis was used to demonstrate that the fungus was indeed the pathogen responsible for the disease. Healthy rocket frogs from El Copé in Panama were collected and shown to be free of B. dendrobatidis. They were then exposed to an isolate of the fungus. Some of these died and from these B. dendrobatidis was reisolated and was demonstrated to be identical to the original infective agent thus fulfilling Koch's postulates.

Conservation status
Colostethus panamansis  is listed as being of "Least Concern" in the IUCN Red List of Threatened Species. This is because it has a wide range in which it is common, and though the population may be declining, this is not at a rate to allow it to qualify for a higher category. The chief threats it faces are deforestation, logging and farming activities including pollution of streams with pesticides.

References

panamansis
Amphibians of Colombia
Amphibians of Panama
Taxa named by Emmett Reid Dunn
Amphibians described in 1933
Taxonomy articles created by Polbot